Blatnica (Cyrillic: Блатница) is a village in the municipality of Čitluk, Bosnia and Herzegovina.

Demographics 
According to the 2013 census, its population was 975.

References

Populated places in Čitluk, Bosnia and Herzegovina